Pasta allo scarpariello   is a traditional Italian pasta dish from Naples.

It is typically made with spaghetti, tomatoes, Pecorino Romano cheese, Parmigiano Reggiano  cheese, basil, chili pepper, extra virgin olive oil, garlic and salt.

Its name literally means "shoemaker's pasta".

See also
Spaghetti alla puttanesca
List of Italian dishes
List of pasta dishes

References

Italian cuisine
Pasta dishes
Peasant food
Neapolitan cuisine
Italian sauces
Tomato sauces
Italian words and phrases
Spaghetti